Tshering is a surname. Notable people with the surname include:
Lotay Tshering (born 1969),  Bhutanese politician and surgeon
Batoo Tshering (born 1951), Bhutanese military person
Pem Tshering (born 1975), Bhutanese female archer
Lhendup Tshering (born 1947), Bhutanese male archer
Pema Tshering (born 1951), Bhutanese male archer
Jigme Tshering (born 1959), Bhutanese male archer
Orgyen Tshering (born 1999), Bhutanese footballer
Tandin Tshering (born 1986), Bhutanese footballer
Dzongkha-language surnames
Surnames of Bhutanese origin